Ziyad Manasir (born 12 December 1965, Amman, Jordan) is a Jordanian-born Russian entrepreneur and businessman. He is the founder of Stroygazconsulting, a construction company based in Russia. He also is the founder of Manaseer Group.

Biography  
Manasir was born on 12 December 1965 in Amman. He attended the Azerbaijan State Oil and Industry University. When he was a student, he began purchasing and selling computers and vehicles. Soon after, he moved on to trading yellow phosphorus, wood, and oil products. In 1994 he bought a construction firm in Tyumen. In 1996 he founded Stroygazconsulting (SGK). In 2014, Manasir decided sold 74.1% of shares SGK to Ruslan Baysarov.

References

1965 births
Living people
Jordanian businesspeople
Russian construction businesspeople
People from Amman